The 41st Baeksang Arts Awards ceremony took place on May 20, 2005 at the Little Angels Performing Arts Center in Seoul. Presented by IS Plus Corp., it was broadcast on SBS and hosted by comedian Park Soo-hong and announcer Lee Hye-seung.

Nominations and winners
Complete list of nominees and winners:

(Winners denoted in bold)

Film

Television

Other awards
Hallyu Special Award - Choi Ji-woo

References

External links
 

Baeksang
Baeksang
Baeksang Arts Awards
Baek
Baek
2000s in Seoul